Klaksvíkar Ítróttarfelag (Faroese for Sports Club of Klaksvík), commonly known as KÍ, is a Faroese professional football club based in Klaksvík. The club was founded in 1904 and is one of the most successful Faroese football clubs, having won the Faroe Islands Premier League 20 times and the Faroe Islands Cup 6 times. The club wears blue and white and plays matches at the Við Djúpumýrar stadium.

History 
KÍ won the inaugural edition of Faroese top-tier football in 1942. In 1992, KÍ Klaksvík participated for the first time on a European stage, competing in the Champions League preliminary round against Skonto Riga of Latvia, where they lost 6–1 on aggregate.

By winning the double in 1999, KÍ reached a total of 17 league titles, a record at the time. KÍ didn't win the league title again until 2019, and although it held the honour of having won the most league titles since the 1950s, it was surpassed by HB in 2004. Although the team signed former great Todi Jónsson and local Atli Danielsen in July 2009 for the remainder of the season, KÍ was relegated for the first time in the club's 105 year-long history at the time. Despite a slow start, they managed to return to the top league for 2011, when they finished fifth under the guidance of manager Aleksandar Đorđević.

In 2012, KÍ did one better than the previous year, and finished in 4th position. The team was the most potent attacking side, scoring 59 goals in 27 matches; Páll Klettskarð scored 22 goals and was the joint top-scorer. In the buildup to the 2013 season, Atli Danielsen and Meinhardt Joensen were signed, helping KÍ to reach the semi-final of the cup. However, they finished the league season in a disappointing 8th place. Ndende Adama Guéye was signed after the season, and the team hired a new manager, Mikkjal Thomassen, who has managed the team until the present. The new manager implemented a new system, foreign to most of the players, and so KÍ experienced a difficult start to the season. Later in the first half of the season, the team had implemented the style, playing attractive, free-flowing attacking football, eventually finishing fifth. In 2016, they missed out on their first league title since 1999 by just one point to Víkingur Gøta, although they did win the Faroe Islands Cup. The next year, they lost the title to the same team by an even closer margin, only having a slightly worse goal difference. While the next season was a disappointment, with the team only finishing fifth, the following years, starting with the 2019 season would prove remarkable ones.

That year, KÍ not only won their first title in twenty years, but they managed to reach the second qualifying round of the UEFA Europa League for the first time, defeating Riteriai from Lithuania on away goals. In 2020, KÍ went one better, becoming the first Faroese team to qualify for the Europa League playoff round by beating Dinamo Tbilisi 6–1 in the third qualifying round, which KÍ had reached for the first time. This shock result, against a much larger and more prestigious European club, was watched by seventy percent of the Klaksvik population, and set up what was labelled 'the biggest game in their history' against the Irish club Dundalk F.C, which they lost 3–1.

Stadium 
KÍ Klaksvík plays its games in Við Djúpumýrar, a stadium with a capacity of 530 (2600 with standing places). For the team's 2020 European qualification, the Tórsvøllur stadium, which normally hosts the national team was used, since the Við Djúpumýrar stadium did not meet UEFA requirements for the third qualifying round and above.

Current squad

Notable former players 

  Rógvi Jacobsen, played 53 matches for the Faroe Islands national team, scored 10 goals.
  Todi Jónsson, played 45 matches for the Faroe Islands national team, scored 9 goals. He played several years for FC Copenhagen in the Danish Superliga.
  Jákup Mikkelsen, played 73 matches for the Faroe Islands national football team as goalkeeper.
  Allan Mørkøre, played 54 matches for the Faroe Islands national team, scored 1 goal.
  Kurt Mørkøre, played 37 matches for the Faroe Islands national team, scored 3 goals.
  Mayowa Alli
  Albert Adu
  Filip Djordjevic

Managers 

  John Reid Bjartalíð (1945–1970)
  Sölvi Óskarsson (1972)
  Tony Paris (1977–1978)
  Peter Kordt (1980)
  Jens Hvidemose (1983–1984)
  Peter Kordt (1985)
  Olvheðin Jacobsen (1986)
  Steffen Petersen (1987)
  Jens Hvidemose (1988)
  John Kramer (1990)
  Petur Mohr (1991–1994)
  Sverri Jacobsen (1994–1995)
  Jóannes Jakobsen (1996–1998)
  Tony Paris (1999)
  Tomislav Sivić (2000–2001)
  Kurt Mørkøre (2002)
  Jan Joensen (2003)
  Ove Flindt Bjerg (2004–2005)
  Oddbjørn Joensen (2005)
  Tony Paris (2006–2007)
  Trygvi Mortensen (2007)
  Eyðun Klakkstein (2007–2008)
  Petur Mohr (2008–2009)
  Aleksandar Đorđević &  Jákup Mikkelsen (2009)
  Petur Mohr (2009–2010)
  Aleksandar Đorđević (2010–2011)
  Páll Guðlaugsson (2012–2013)
  Eyðun Klakstein (2013–2014)
  Mikkjal Thomassen (2014–2022)
  Magne Hoseth (2022–)

Honours 
 Faroe Islands Premier League
 Winners (20): 1942, 1945, 1952, 1953, 1954, 1956, 1957, 1958, 1961, 1966, 1967, 1968, 1969, 1970, 1972, 1991, 1999, 2019, 2021, 2022
 Runners-up (13): 1947, 1951, 1959, 1962, 1963, 1971, 1973, 1974, 1975, 1996, 1998, 2016, 2017
 Faroe Islands Cup
 Winners (6): 1966, 1967, 1990, 1994, 1999, 2016
 Finalists (10): 1955, 1957, 1973, 1976, 1979, 1992, 1998, 2001, 2006, 2022
 Faroe Islands Super Cup
 Winners (2): 2020, 2022
 Runners-up (1): 2017

European record

Overview

Matches 

Notes
 PR: Preliminary round
 QR: Qualifying round
 1QR: First qualifying round
 2QR: Second qualifying round
 3QR: Third qualifying round
 PO: Playoff round

See also 

 KÍ Klaksvík (women)
 List of football clubs in the Faroe Islands

References

External links 

 Homepage Official website of KÍ Klaksvík
 Homepage Official KÍ supporter club

Association football clubs established in 1904
1904 establishments in the Faroe Islands
Sport in Klaksvík
KÍ Klaksvík